Kettenbrückengasse  is a station on  of the Vienna U-Bahn. It is located in the Margareten District. It opened on the Wiener Stadtbahn in 1899 and became an U-Bahn station in 1980.

References

Buildings and structures in Margareten
Railway stations opened in 1899
Vienna U-Bahn stations
Otto Wagner buildings
Art Nouveau architecture in Vienna
Art Nouveau railway stations
1899 establishments in Austria
Railway stations in Austria opened in the 19th century